Kevin Wylie (born June 12, 1968) is a retired American soccer defender who spent one season with the New England Revolution in Major League Soccer.  He also played in the American Professional Soccer League and USISL and was a 1989 Division I First-Team All-American.

Youth
Wylie attended Ridgefield High School in Ridgefield, Connecticut before entering the University of Vermont.  In Vermont, he played on the soccer team from 1986 to 1989, earning first team All American recognition in 1989.  While he began as a forward, by his junior season, he has moved to sweeper.  In 1990, he left school to pursue his professional career, but returned to graduate in 1991.  He was inducted into the University of Vermont Athletic Hall of Fame in 2001.

Professional
In 1990, Wylie spent one season with the New Mexico Chiles of the American Professional Soccer League (APSL).  Wylie then returned to Vermont to complete his education.  At this point, Wylie’s career becomes vague.  His Vermont Hall of Fame bio states that he played for the New Mexico Chiles from 1991 to 1993.  However, the Chiles lasted only the 1990 season.  In 1991, the New Mexico Roadrunners were renamed the Chiles, but Wylie is not listed on any of their rosters from 1991 to 1996.  His Hall of Fame bio states that Wylie returned to the northeast after the 1993 season to play for the Cape Cod Crusaders of the USISL.  That matches with the founding of the Crusaders in 1994.  In May 1996, Wylie completed a successful trial with the New England Revolution of Major League Soccer.  He played twenty-two games that season before being released.  He then began the 1997 season with the Crusaders before being called up to the Revs for nine games.  New England waived him on May 29, 1997 and he finished the season with the Vermont Wanderers.   The Wanderers were sold at the end of the season and the new ownership renamed the team the Vermont Voltage.  Wylie signed with the Voltage on February 8, 1998, but left the team during the preseason.  At this point, Wylie’s career again becomes difficult to follow.  It appears that he moved to Boston in the spring of 1998 with a mention that he may have played for the Boston Bulldogs.  However, other records show him playing for the Crusadars in 1998 and 1999.

References

External links
 

1968 births
Living people
All-American men's college soccer players
American soccer players
USISL players
Cape Cod Crusaders players
Vermont Voltage players
American Professional Soccer League players
New Mexico Chiles (APSL) players
New England Revolution players
Vermont Catamounts men's soccer players
Major League Soccer players
People from Hyannis, Massachusetts
Sportspeople from Barnstable County, Massachusetts
Association football defenders